Mitchell Downie (9 September 1923 – 12 July 2001) was a Scottish professional footballer, who played as a goalkeeper. Active in both Scotland and England, Downie made over 500 appearances in Scottish and English league football.

Career
Born in Troon, Downie began his career during World War II with Hibernian. His professional career began in 1946 with Kilmarnock, and he later played for Airdrie, Bradford Park Avenue, Lincoln City, Bradford City and Doncaster Rovers, making a total of 563 appearances in Scottish and English league football.

Downie also played non-league football with Goole Town and Altrincham.

References

1923 births
2001 deaths
Scottish footballers
Hibernian F.C. players
Kilmarnock F.C. players
Airdrieonians F.C. (1878) players
Bradford (Park Avenue) A.F.C. players
Lincoln City F.C. players
Bradford City A.F.C. players
Doncaster Rovers F.C. players
Goole Town F.C. players
Altrincham F.C. players
Scottish Football League players
English Football League players
Association football goalkeepers